Muis, Muijs, or Muys  is a Dutch surname. It is either a patronymic, from a short form of the given name Bartholomeus, or can be metaphoric or descriptive, referring to a mouse (modern Dutch  muis). The Sumatran and French surnames have different origins. People with this name include:

Abdul Muis (1886–1959), Indonesian writer, journalist and nationalist
Albert Muis (1914–1988), Dutch painter
 (born 1976), Dutch actor and presenter
Cornelis Muys (1500–1572), Dutch Catholic priest and New Latin poet known as Cornelis Musius
Jan Muijs (1898–1968), Dutch Greco-Roman wrestler
Krista R. Muis, Canadian academic psychologist
Marianne Muis (born 1968), Dutch swimmer, twin sister of Mildred
Mildred Muis (born 1968), Dutch swimmer, twin sister of Marianne

See also
Siméon Marotte de Muis (1587–1644), French churchman and Hebraist
MUIS

References

Dutch-language surnames

af:Muis (dubbelsinnig)
de:Muis
nl:Muis